Hexacorallia is a class of Anthozoa comprising approximately 4,300 species of aquatic organisms formed of polyps, generally with 6-fold symmetry. It includes all of the stony corals, most of which are colonial and reef-forming, as well as all sea anemones, and zoanthids, arranged within five extant orders. The hexacorallia are distinguished from another class of Anthozoa, Octocorallia, in having six or fewer axes of symmetry in their body structure; the tentacles are simple and unbranched and normally number more than eight. These organisms are formed of individual soft polyps which in some species live in colonies and can secrete a calcite skeleton. As with all Cnidarians, these organisms have a complex life cycle including a motile planktonic phase and a later characteristic sessile phase. Hexacorallia also include the significant extinct order of rugose corals.

Phylogeny
Hexacorallia is considered to be monophyletic, that is all contained species are descended from a common ancestor, however it has been suggested that many of the current orders are not. Historically, Antipatharia was considered to be in a separate class called Ceriantipatharia, though more recent genetic studies place it in Hexacorallia.

The class includes important coral reef builders such as the stony corals, sea anemones, and zoanthids. The recognized orders are shown below:
 Actiniaria - sea anemones
 Antipatharia - black corals
 Corallimorpharia - corallimorpharians aka "false corals"
 †Rugosa - rugose corals 
 Scleractinia - stony corals
 †Tabulata - tabular corals
 Zoantharia - zoanthids

References

External links
 

 
Anthozoa
Animal classes